SBJ may refer to:

Statistics Bureau of Japan
Stourbridge Junction railway station